is a 2005 platform game developed by Sega Studios USA (the former United States division of Sonic Team) and published by Sega as part of the Sonic the Hedgehog series. The game follows Shadow the Hedgehog, a creation of Doctor Eggman's grandfather, Prof. Gerald Robotnik with the aid of Black Doom, as he attempts to learn about his past while suffering from amnesia. Shadow the Hedgehog reintroduces third-person shooter elements from Sonic Adventure 1 and Sonic Adventure 2 but greatly expands on the concept and newly introduces nonlinear gameplay to the Sonic franchise. To defeat enemies, Shadow can use a variety of weapons from each faction and use the newly introduced Chaos powers to aid him in his quest. Out of the twenty-two levels there are eleven that have three possible missions that the player may choose to complete, the other eleven have two missions. The missions completed determine the game's plot and subsequently playable levels.

The development team wanted to make a game featuring Shadow to capitalize on the character's popularity and resolve plot mysteries that began with his introduction in Sonic Adventure 2. It was written and directed by Takashi Iizuka, produced by Yuji Naka, and scored by Jun Senoue. Iizuka, who targeted a younger audience with previous Sonic games, strove to attract an older audience with Shadow the Hedgehog; Shadow's character also allowed the team to use elements otherwise inappropriate for the series. 

The game was revealed at the March 2005 Walk of Game event, and it was released for the GameCube, PlayStation 2, and Xbox in North America and in Europe in November 2005 and in Japan the following month. It was met with generally negative  reviews from critics, who criticized for its controls, mature themes, level design, and addition of guns and other weapons to traditional Sonic gameplay. However, some praised its replay value. Despite this, the game was commercially successful, selling 2.06 million copies by March 2007.

It is the first game in the series to utilize the voice actors from the 4Kids dub of Sonic X. It is also the first Sonic game to receive an E10+ rating from the ESRB, due to its mild use of profanity and fantasy action violence.

Gameplay
Shadow the Hedgehog is a platform game that incorporates elements from the Third-person Shooter genre and elements from the Action-adventure genre. Like previous games in the Sonic series, basic gameplay involves running quickly, collecting rings, tricky platforming and destroying enemies. Shadow collects rings as a form of health; when he is attacked by an enemy or takes damage from the environment, ten of his rings bounce away from and form into a circle around him. When Shadow has no rings and takes damage from an enemy he dies, loses a life and goes back to the last checkpoint. Each level is completed by undertaking a mission, and each mission is labelled "Hero," "Dark," or "Normal". The "Hero" missions involve completing tasks for the Sonic series' heroic characters, or Doctor Eggman on one occasion, and the "Dark" missions involve completing tasks for Black Doom or Doctor Eggman. The "Normal" missions involve reaching the Chaos Emerald or Goal Ring at the end of the stage. Examples of non-neutral mission objectives include killing all enemies in the stages, destroying an aircraft flying to the end of the level, or activating or destroying objects in the stage. All enemies attack Shadow regardless of the mission chosen. The mission types selected affect the plot, the levels played, and the ending received out of ten possibilities. Each level features cutscenes that advance the story, and seven levels also feature boss battles. There are 326 possible paths to take in Shadow the Hedgehog, and each pathway is individually named.

New gameplay features distinguish Shadow the Hedgehog from previous Sonic games. For example, Shadow can pick up and use guns to combat enemies, adding an element of third-person shooter gameplay that in past games were the simple lock-on and fire mechanic. Parts of the scenery, such as traffic signs, can also be used as weapons. Another new feature is the ability to drive vehicles, such as motorcycles and an alien aircraft. Although Shadow can outrun the game's vehicles, the latter have unique capabilities, such as crushing enemies and traversing otherwise impassable acid-covered areas.

As in most Sonic series games, the Chaos Emeralds play a major role; they help Shadow remember his past and allow him to perform Chaos Control and Chaos Blast. Chaos Control allows Shadow to move more quickly in levels and slows time in boss battles, and Chaos Blast creates an explosion that destroys or severely damages all nearby enemies. Shadow can perform Chaos Control after the player fills the Hero Gauge by defeating Black Arms soldiers (or by doing other heroic acts such as; putting out fires and healing wounded soldiers), and he can perform Chaos Blast after filling the Dark Gauge by defeating G.U.N. soldiers (or other evil acts such as; healing the enemies or destroying scenery).

The game includes a two-player mode that retains the single-player mechanics but is set in one of three specially designed stages and uses a vertically split screen to separate each player's view. Each player chooses one of the available characters—Shadow, two metallic versions of him, and palette-swapped variants of each. The combatants attack each other and steal each other's rings until one is eliminated. Additionally, in single-player mode, a second player may take control of Shadow's hero sidekick characters (you cannot control Doom's Eye or Dr. Eggman) in the stages, however this feature isn't in the Xbox version of the game.

Synopsis

Characters

Shadow the Hedgehog, the game's titular protagonist, was created 50 years before the game's events by Prof. Gerald Robotnik in an orbital military research space colony known as the ARK. Robotnik was trying to unlock the secrets of eternal life on the government's orders and create the "Ultimate Life Form." To that end, Robotnik designed Shadow to harness the powers of the Chaos Emeralds. He saw G.U.N raid the ARK and shoot Robotnik’s granddaughter Maria Robotnik, killing her. At the end of Sonic Adventure 2, his first in-game appearance, Shadow was presumed dead, but he returned in Sonic Heroes and suffers amnesia.

The Guardian Units of Nations (G.U.N.) is the military of Earth's government, the United Federation, and it is directed by the G.U.N. Commander, who has a hatred of Shadow. When completing "Hero" missions, Shadow usually helps G.U.N. and heroic characters from the Sonic series, including Sonic, Tails, Knuckles, Amy, Rouge, Omega, Vector, Charmy, and Espio. Their aim is to protect Earth from both Doctor Eggman and the Black Arms, an army of various related alien species that invade Earth from the Black Comet. Black Doom, the leader of the Black Arms, sends an extension of himself called "Doom's Eye" to watch Shadow and help him complete missions. When completing "Dark" missions, Shadow helps either Black Doom or Doctor Eggman, each of whom wants the Chaos Emeralds for himself. In one "Hero" mission of Sky Troops, Shadow assists Doctor Eggman in battling the Black Arms.

Plot

Shadow suffers from amnesia, only able to remember two things: his name and his attempt to escape the Space Colony ARK with his creator's granddaughter Maria, who was killed by G.U.N. soldiers. Having walked through a room filled with androids that look like him during the events of Sonic Heroes, Shadow wonders if he, too, is an android. While Shadow is reminiscing outside the city of Westopolis, an alien race called the Black Arms drops out of the sky and invades the city. Black Doom, the Black Arms' leader, contacts Shadow and tells him of an old promise made to bring the Chaos Emeralds to him. Stunned that Black Doom knows his name, Shadow searches for the Chaos Emeralds to learn about his past.

The game progresses through the Westopolis level and five more levels from the different paths Shadow may take. As missions are completed, Shadow learns more about his past and regains memories. He can choose to help Doctor Eggman, the Black Arms, or G.U.N. and the series' heroic characters, or he can choose to help neither and keep the Chaos Emeralds for himself. The missions completed determine which one of ten possible endings will be seen after Shadow collects all the Chaos Emeralds and defeats one of the game's final bosses. The possible ending events range from helping the heroes destroy the Black Arms or to help Black Doom destroy the planet.

Completing all ten endings unlocks the game's true ending. After collecting all the Chaos Emeralds, Black Doom uses Chaos Control to bring the Black Comet to the Earth's surface. Black Doom explains that the Black Arms intend to use humans as an energy source, and the Black Comet begins to release a nerve gas into the Earth's atmosphere that causes total paralysis to those who inhale it. Immune to the paralyzation, Shadow confronts Black Doom where he discovers that Professor Gerald Robotnik created the ARK's Eclipse Cannon to destroy the Black Comet. During their confrontation, Black Doom reveals that Shadow was created using his blood, and he attempts to use mind control on Shadow, but fails. Black Doom then transforms into a giant beast form called Devil Doom; in response, Shadow uses the Chaos Emeralds to transform into Super Shadow and confronts Devil Doom. During the battle, Doctor Eggman confirms to Shadow that he is the original and not an android. Shadow defeats Devil Doom and uses Chaos Control to teleport the Black Comet back into Earth's orbit, where he obliterates it using the Eclipse Cannon. His friends are elated, as are people at G.U.N. headquarters. Shadow is then seen in the ARK's observation deck holding up a photograph of Maria and Gerald. Recalling Maria's last words to him, "Goodbye forever... Shadow the Hedgehog", Shadow discards the photograph and walks away.

Development

Shadow the Hedgehog was developed by Sega Studios USA, the now-defunct United States division of Sega's Sonic Team, and published by Sega. Sega first revealed the game and its tagline ("Hero or villain? You decide.") at the March 8, 2005 inauguration of Sonic the Hedgehog into the Walk of Game. Sega formally announced development of the game for the Nintendo GameCube, PlayStation 2, and Xbox video game consoles on March 23, 2005. The same year, Sega released the game in North America on November 15, 2005, in Europe on November 18, 2005, and Japan on December 15, 2005.

Sonic Team's Takashi Iizuka and series co-creator Yuji Naka led the game’s development, with Iizuka serving as writer and director and Naka as producer. Iizuka, who had worked on the Sonic the Hedgehog series since 1993, targeted a younger audience with previous Sonic games and wanted to attract an older audience with Shadow the Hedgehog. The game's development team wanted to make a game featuring Shadow to resolve plot mysteries that began with the character's introduction in Sonic Adventure 2. The team felt that Shadow's design—inspired by films such as Underworld, Constantine, and the Terminator series—would make the story darker and allow for elements, such as vehicles and weapons, otherwise considered inappropriate for a Sonic game. Naka stated in an interview with GameSpy that he wanted to use Shadow as the game's main character due to his popularity among fans and being the best fit for a "gun action" game.

The game features several CGI-animated cutscenes produced by Blur Studio.  The music of Shadow the Hedgehog was composed by Jun Senoue, with additional work by Yutaka Minobe, Tomoya Ohtani, and Mariko Nanba. Lost and Found: Shadow the Hedgehog Vocal Trax is a video game soundtrack album released on CD on February 22, 2006. The album contains seven vocal songs from the game, one of which is a remix rather than the original. Another soundtrack, Shadow the Hedgehog: Original Soundtrax, was also released on February 22, 2006. It contains both vocal and instrumental tracks from the game. 

In Japan, Shadow the Hedgehog was promoted through a collaboration with Japanese hip hop group M-flo, whose song "Tripod Baby" was remixed and featured in the commercial under the title "Tripod Baby (Shadow the Hedgehog Mix)". In addition to this, an alternate music video for "Tripod Baby" featuring the remix included new scenes with Shadow.

Uniquely, the game contains profanities, particularly the frequent use of the words "damn" and "hell" spoken by Shadow and other characters such as Espio, the G.U.N. Commander, Knuckles, and Sonic. The decision to include profanity and firearms was made early in development as it focused on a more mature tone. The ESRB ultimately assigned the game an E10+ rating for "fantasy violence" and "mild language".

The game was also the first in the Sonic series to use the 4Kids cast from Sonic X following the death of Doctor Eggman's previous voice actor, Deem Bristow. This cast continued to be used until late 2010 when all cast members except for Mike Pollock were replaced before the release of Sonic Free Riders.

Reception

Shadow the Hedgehog received "generally unfavorable" reviews from critics, many of which were highly critical of its gameplay mechanics and differences from other Sonic games. However, it was voted the best game of 2005 in the Official Jetix Magazine Reader Awards and named the "Best Platformer" of 2005 by Nintendo Power readers (receiving more votes than the staff's choice, Sonic Rush). Shadow the Hedgehog was also a commercial success: Sega reported 1.59 million units sold from its release to March 2006 and 470,000 units sold in the U.S. from March 2006 to March 2007, for total sales of at least 2.06 million. The game was later released as a part of three budget lines: Greatest Hits and Platinum Range for the PlayStation 2 (representing sales of at least 400,000 in North America and Europe, respectively) and Player's Choice for the GameCube (250,000 in North America).

Many critics derided the game's sense of maturity for a Sonic game, especially the addition of guns and other weapons. Game Informer staff writer Matt Helgeson said, "not only is this new 'adult' interpretation of Sonic painfully dumb, it’s also ill-advised and almost feels like a betrayal to longtime fans." Eurogamer staff writer Tom Bramwell felt that "the game's other selling point – its darker edge – [is] not really meant for us." G4's X-Play and GameSpy staff writer Patrick Klepek thought similarly. In contrast, Nintendo Power staff writer Steve Thomason rated the game 8.0 out of 10, stating, "this darker take on the Sonic universe succeeds for the most part, giving the series a bit of an edge without going overboard on violence." In addition, Official Xbox Magazine reassured readers, "Don't worry, Shadow the Hedgehog isn't half as 'urban' or quite as 'gangsta' as it first seems." Helgeson panned the game's "laughable" plot, saying it "makes no sense," and that various Sonic conventions undermined its attempts to be "mature" or "edgy".

Reviewers also noted the game's controls, especially Shadow's homing attack causing unexpected character deaths. Game Informers Matt Helgeson complained that the attack "frequently sends you careening off into nothingness, resulting in cheap death after cheap death." Nintendo Power, X-Play, Eurogamer, Official Xbox Magazine, and GameSpy agreed. Other complaints focused on the mechanics of weapons and vehicles. Greg Mueller of GameSpot felt that the guns were nearly useless because of a lack of a target lock or manual aim, combined with an ineffective auto-aim. IGN staff writer Matt Casamassina, 1UP.com staff writer Greg Sewart, Game Informer, X-Play, GameSpy, and London's The Times also criticized the mechanics of Shadow's weapons, vehicles, and other aspects of the game's controls. However, Thomason said that "blasting Shadow's foes with the wide variety of weapons at his disposal is just plain fun."

The level design received mixed comments. Mueller called some levels "extremely frustrating". Helgeson stated that the fast-paced "levels are poorly designed", and Andrew Reiner, who wrote a second-opinion review for Game Informer, called the level design "disastrous". Official Xbox Magazine was more mixed, balancing the possibility of getting lost in the large levels with the likely appeal of these stages to 3D Sonic gamers, particularly those who had enjoyed Sonic Heroes. GameTrailers found that "the levels are either dark and urban, or bright and psychedelic. Either way, they fit in well to the Sonic universe. They are loaded with speed ramps, loops and an assortment of other boosts that rocket Shadow like a pinball." Bettenhausen included "the classic run-like-hell roller coaster design philosophy" of some stages in his limited praise. Casamassina disliked the "stupid level design", saying that "[j]ust because they dazzled players six years ago does not mean that Sonic Team can copy and paste exactly the same loops and spins into each new franchise iteration and expect everyone to be happy with the outcome." GameSpy observed that "the areas are much less open than in previous Sonic games, but the level designers haven't taken advantage of the constraints." Nintendo Power singled out the difficulty of the missions that require the player to locate objects.

Critics praised the game's replay value, applauding the many possible paths that a player may take through the game. GameTrailers stated, "this choose-your-own-adventure style gives the game replay value that many platformers lack." The Australian publication Herald Sun, Nintendo Power, and Official Xbox Magazine thought similarly. GameSpot praised the variety of alternate endings, but concluded that "the gameplay isn't fun enough to warrant playing the game through multiple times." Bettenhausen thought that the morality system felt artificial, but said that it extended the game's replay value.

Notes

References

External links
 
Official PlayStation website
Announcement trailer, shown at the Walk of Game awards in 2005

2005 video games
3D platform games
Alien invasions in video games
Video games about cloning
Multiplayer and single-player video games
Split-screen multiplayer games
Games about extraterrestrial life
Military science fiction video games
GameCube games
PlayStation 2 games
PlayStation Network games
Post-apocalyptic video games
RenderWare games
Sega video games
Sega Studio USA games
Terrorism in fiction
Third-person shooters
Video games about amnesia
Video games about revenge
Video games developed in the United States
Video games with alternate endings
Video games with pre-rendered 3D graphics
Xbox games
Video games produced by Yuji Naka
Video games scored by Jun Senoue
Video games scored by Tomoya Ohtani
Sonic the Hedgehog spin-off games
Video game memes
Internet memes introduced in 2009
Video games scored by Mariko Nanba
Video games scored by Yutaka Minobe
Cyberpunk video games
Video game spin-offs